Graham Kennedy (1939 – 2002) also known by the nickname o "Ginger", was a New Zealand rugby league footballer and coach who represented New Zealand.

Early years
Kennedy attended Marist Brothers High School where he played in the first eleven and first fifteen. He twice made the Schoolboy Kiwis side.

Kennedy then attended teachers college in Christchurch, where he played two seasons of rugby union and made the Canterbury Colts side.

Playing career
He played rugby league for the Marist club in the West Coast Rugby League competition and also represented the West Coast. He was a South Island representative between 1959 and 1965.

Kennedy also played for the New Zealand national rugby league team, playing in 64 games, including 21 tests between 1961 and 1966. He played four matches as captain of the Kiwis.

In 1963, he won the New Zealand Rugby League's player of the year award.

While in Greymouth, Kennedy taught at his old school and Grey Main School. He was the first lay principal of Christian Brothers High School.

Coaching career
In 1967, Kennedy moved to Australia, becoming the player-coach of the Wagga Kangaroos in the Group 9 Rugby League competition. He became a respected coach, in 1980 Kennedy was only one of three to hold the top NSWRL grading outside of Sydney.

He taught at St Michael's Regional High School in Wagga Wagga for 27 years before becoming the principal of St Dominic's College, Penrith in 1994, serving until his death in 2002.

References

New Zealand rugby league players
New Zealand national rugby league team players
West Coast rugby league team players
Rugby league centres
New Zealand rugby league coaches
Marist (West Coast) players
New Zealand schoolteachers
1939 births
New Zealand rugby union players
2002 deaths
Rugby league fullbacks
Rugby league wingers
Rugby league halfbacks
New Zealand national rugby league team captains
Junior Kiwis players
People educated at John Paul II High School, Greymouth